Tremellochaete is a genus of fungi in the family Auriculariaceae. Species produce pustular or lobed, effused, gelatinous basidiocarps (fruit bodies) on wood, typically covered in small sterile spines or pegs.

Taxonomy
The genus was originally created in 1964 by Estonian mycologist Ain Raitviir to accommodate Tremellochaete japonica, a species that appeared morphologically intermediate between the older genera Exidia and Heterochaete. Tremellochaete was subsequently treated as a synonym of Exidia by some authors until shown to be distinct as a result of molecular research, based on cladistic analysis of DNA sequences. Several additional species have now been referred to Tremellochaete.

References

External links

Auriculariales
Agaricomycetes genera